Tetratheca parvifolia is a species of plant in the quandong family that is endemic to Australia.

Description
The species grows as a small shrub to 20–30 cm in height. The pink flowers appear in October.

Distribution and habitat
The range of the species lies in the Swan Coastal Plain and Jarrah Forest IBRA bioregions of south-west Western Australia.

References

parvifolia
Eudicots of Western Australia
Oxalidales of Australia
Taxa named by Joy Thompson
Plants described in 1976